Lloyd John Voss (February 13, 1942 — March 1, 2007) was an American football defensive end. He was drafted in the first round by the Green Bay Packers in the 1964 NFL Draft. He played most of his career with the Pittsburgh Steelers.

Voss reportedly died of liver and kidney failure.

References
Packer Report March 3, 2007

1942 births
2007 deaths
People from Adrian, Minnesota
Players of American football from Minnesota
American football defensive ends
Nebraska Cornhuskers football players
Green Bay Packers players
Pittsburgh Steelers players
Denver Broncos players
Deaths from kidney failure